Julia Davis (born 1966) is an English comedy writer and performer.

Julia Davis may also refer to:

 Julia Davis (fencer) (born 1941), British Olympic fencer
 Julia Davis (educator) (1891–1993), American teacher
 Julia Davis (journalist) (1974–), Ukrainian-American journalist

See also 
 Julie Davis (born 1969), American film director, writer and actress